Zhengshi (正始) was a Chinese era name used by several emperors of China. It may refer to:

Zhengshi (240–249), era name used by Cao Fang, emperor of Cao Wei
Zhengshi (407–409), era name used by Gao Yun (emperor)
Zhengshi (504–508), era name used by Emperor Xuanwu of Northern Wei